Belgharia is a locality in Kamarhati Municipality of North 24 Parganas district in the Indian state of West Bengal. It is a part of the area covered by Kolkata Metropolitan Development Authority (KMDA) and a vital locality in Kolkata metropolitan area (or Greater Kolkata). Belgharia is also known for wholesale market for all types of Bags/Luggages/Purse etc. One must visit and check the Bag Market beside Belgharia Railway Station.  Dakshineswar Kali Temple of Kolkata is in approximately three kilometers distance from Belgharia Railway Station. The Vivekananda Setu on the river of Hooghly which is one of the oldest bridge in Calcutta established for the connection between the city of Howrah and Kolkata is also at the adjacent area of Belgharia.

Geography

Location
96% of the population of Barrackpore subdivision (partly presented in the map alongside, all places marked on the map are linked in the full screen map) lives in urban areas. In 2011, it had a density of population of 10,967 per km2. The subdivision has 16 municipalities and 24 census towns.

For most of the cities/ towns information regarding density of population is available in the Infobox. Population data is not available for neighbourhoods. It is available for the entire Municipal area and thereafter ward-wise.

Police station
Belgharia police station under Barrackpore Police Commissionerate has jurisdiction over Kamarhati Municipal area.

Demographics

Kolkata Urban Agglomeration
The following Municipalities, Census Towns and other locations in Barrackpore subdivision were part of Kolkata Urban Agglomeration in the 2011 census: Kanchrapara (M), Jetia (CT), Halisahar (M), Balibhara (CT), Naihati (M), Bhatpara (M), Kaugachhi (CT), Garshyamnagar (CT), Garulia (M), Ichhapur Defence Estate (CT), North Barrackpur (M), Barrackpur Cantonment (CB), Barrackpore (M), Jafarpur (CT), Ruiya (CT), Titagarh (M), Khardaha (M), Bandipur (CT), Panihati (M), Muragachha (CT) New Barrackpore (M), Chandpur (CT), Talbandha (CT), Patulia (CT), Kamarhati (M), Baranagar (M), South Dumdum (M), North Dumdum (M), Dum Dum (M), Noapara (CT), Babanpur (CT), Teghari (CT), Nanna (OG), Chakla (OG), Srotribati (OG) and Panpur (OG).

Economy
Belgharia has now become a business hub, well connected with Kolkata through trains, buses and other means of transport. The nearest Industrial area is Kamarhatty (3 km), with the following companies: Agarpara Jute Mill, Allied Ceramic, ESDEE Allumina, Emami, Kamarhatty Jute Mill, Texmaco, TIL, WIMCO.

Transport
Feeder road is one of the main roads in Belgharia. Feeder road connects Belgharia to Barrackpore Trunk Road (B.T. Road) on the west and through Madhusudan Banerjee Road (M.B. Road) to Nimta, Birati and consequently to Jessore Road in the east. Feeder Road and Madhusudan Banerjee Road (M.B. Road) are connected with a rail over-bridge named Kabi Satyendranath Dutta Setu above Belgharia railway station. The newly built Belghoria Expressway which links with Dumdum/Kolkata Airport on Jessore Road and Nivedita Setu on the Hooghly River increased the importance of this place.

Bus

Private Bus
 56 Ruiya Purbapara - Howrah Station
 78 Barrackpore Court - Esplanade
 78/1 Rahara Bazar/Parthapur - Babughat
 81/1 Rajchandrapur - Barasat
 201 Nimta Post Office- Salt Lake Sector-V
 214 Sajirhat - Babughat
 214A Sodepur Girja - Esplanade
 230 Kamarhati/Agarpara railway station - Alipore Zoo
 234 Belgharia railway station - Golf Green
 234/1 Belgharia railway station - Golf Green
 DN2 Dakshineswar - Barasat
 DN43 Dakshineswar - Barasat Checkpost

Mini Bus
 S180 Nandannagar - Howrah Maidan
 S185 Nimta Paikpara - Howrah Station

WBTC Bus
 C28 Barrackpore Court - Howrah Station
 E32 Nilganj - Howrah Station
 S9A Dunlop/Belgharia (Rathtala) - Ballygunge railway station
 S11 Nilganj - Esplanade
 S32 Barrackpore Court - Howrah Station
 S32A Belgharia (Rathtala) - Howrah Station
 AC2B Belgharia (Rathtala) - Jadavpur (Sulekha)
 AC20 Barrackpore Court - Santragachi railway station (8 AM to 9 AM and afternoon 2 PM to 3 PM. In the Evening, the Bus plies from B.B.D. Bagh to Dunlop.)
 AC54 Belgharia (Rathtala) - Howrah Station
 EB1A Belgharia (Rathtala) - Nabanna/Santragachi railway station

Bus Routes Without Numbers
 Madhyamgram - Howrah station
 Sodepur Girja - Uluberia Court
 Lalkuthi – Howrah Station
 Barrackpore Court - Salap
 Barrackpore Court - Mourigram railway station

Train

Belgharia railway station is one of the stations on the main train line (Sealdah-Ranaghat line) starting from Sealdah Station.

Metro Rail

The Baranagar metro station, which is a part of the Kolkata Metro Line 1 (North-South line) and will also serve as the planned terminus of Kolkata Metro Line 5, is close to Belgharia. Kamarhati is also a planned Metro Station of Kolkata Metro Line 5, near to Belgharia.

Education
Bhairab Ganguly College was established at Belgharia in 1968. It was built by Sri Jibandhan Ganguli (Grandson of Sri Bhairab Ganguli), who contributed the land of 8.13 acres for the construction of a higher education institution. It offers honours courses in Bengali, English, Sanskrit, Hindi, Urdu, history, philosophy, political science, geography, education, physical education, physics, chemistry, mathematics, botany, zoology, physiology, economics, electronics, computer science, accountancy and general BA, BSc and B Com courses.

Ramakrishna mission shilpapitha is also situated in belghoria. This is one of the oldest diploma engineering colleges in west bengal est. 1951. It offers diploma in engineering in civil, electrical, mechanical and electronics and communications engineering courses.

Here is situated RICE head office. An institution that teaches students and help to get job .

References

External links

Cities and towns in North 24 Parganas district
Neighbourhoods in North 24 Parganas district
Neighbourhoods in Kolkata
Kolkata Metropolitan Area